This is a list of seasons completed by the Wyoming Cowboys football team. Representing the University of Wyoming, the Cowboys compete in the Mountain Division of the Mountain West Conference in the NCAA Division I FBS. Wyoming plays their home games out of 29,181-seat War Memorial Stadium in Laramie, Wyoming. The Cowboys began playing football as an independent in 1893, and joined the Rocky Mountain Athletic Conference in 1916. The team played in the Western Athletic Conference from 1962 to 1998, and joined the Mountain West in 1999. They are currently led by head coach Craig Bohl, who was hired in 2014.

Wyoming has three main rivalries, each with Mountain West opponents. The most notable of these is the Border War played against the Colorado State Rams. The winner receives the prized "Bronze Boot". Wyoming has won the last two meetings in the rivalry. The Cowboys also have rivalries with Hawaii and Utah State, the latter known as "Bridger's Battle".

Seasons

Notes

References

Wyoming Cowboys

Wyoming Cowboys football seasons